Trophy, Hypertrophied (1919) is a work of art by the German artist Max Ernst who was a pioneer of the Dada movement and Surrealism in Europe. This work is believed to be one of Ernst's earliest known pieces. The work was produced using a technique called line-block printing – a type of relief printing – to which Ernst later added further detail by drawing over the design with pen and ink. It depicts a complex mechanical instrument featuring a series of pulleys, gears and planetary symbols. The style of the work resembles a schematic drawing or architectural plan. Ernst created a similar piece the same year titled Farewell My Beautiful Land of Mary Laurencen. Help! Help! Trophy, Hypertrophied is a part of the collection of the Museum of Modern Art in New York City, USA.

References 

Paintings by Max Ernst

1919 paintings
Paintings in the collection of the Museum of Modern Art (New York City)
20th-century prints